Glyptonotus antarcticus is a benthic marine isopod crustacean in the suborder Valvifera. This relatively large isopod is found in the Southern Ocean around Antarctica. It was first described by James Eights in 1852 and the type locality is the South Shetland Islands.

Description
It has two pairs of compound eyes, a large pair on the dorsal surface and a smaller pair on the ventral surface. Glyptonotus antarcticus has only five ommatidia, which is unusual for crustaceans and insects. It is thought that the latter are useful when the animal is swimming, which it does in an upside-down position. With the exception of the eyes, certain mouthparts and feet, the whole surface of the animal has minute cuticular outgrowths of feathery hairs and knobbly scales. It is thought that these may help to prevent attachment of Foraminifera and marine larval organisms on the body surface.

Distribution and habitat
Glyptonotus antarcticus is native to the Southern Ocean around Antarctica, where it occurs in large numbers.

Biology
Glyptonotus antarcticus is a carnivore and scavenger and is often caught in baited traps on the seabed. It is an opportunistic predator with a mixed diet which includes a high proportion of echinoderms, but it is also cannibalistic. That the available food supply may be fairly constant is shown by the fact that it breeds at any time of year. The eggs and young are brooded for an extended period—more than 1½ year—in the female's marsupium where they are nourished by a maternal secretion. As typical of Antarctic isopods, there is no pelagic larval stage.

Research
Given its abundance and the fact that it is relatively easy to keep in aquaria, Glyptonotus antarcticus has become an important model organism used as a research object in ecological, biochemical and physiological studies. A 2005 genetic study suggested that Glyptonotus antarcticus may in fact represent several distinct species.

References

Valvifera
Fauna of the Southern Ocean
Crustaceans described in 1852